Grant Stanley Dalton  (born 1 July 1957) is a New Zealand sailor who has competed in five Whitbread Round the World Races and currently manages Team New Zealand.

Background
Dalton is a professional sailor who started sailing at the age 8 in the P Class and soon started racing as a member of Maraetai Sailing Club. He was appointed an Officer of the Order of the British Empire in the 1995 New Year Honours, for services to yachting. He was shortlisted in 2001 by the International Sailing Federation for the ISAF World Sailor of the Year Awards.

His other passion away from sailing is motor racing; as an avid F1 fan and with life with Emirates Team New Zealand more settled than a round-the-world campaign, he can now race on the New Zealand motor racing circuit.

Sailing career

Offshore racing
Grant Dalton has raced around the world seven times; the first five as part of the Whitbread Round the World Race later to be called the Volvo Ocean Race. This race has evolved through this time from a race of adventurers to a grand prix yachting event. Dalton has participated in the following major events:

 1981–82 Whitbread in Flyer II 
 1983 Southern Cross Cup 
 1985 Admiral's Cup  
 1985–86 Whitbread in Lion New Zealand 
 1987 Admiral's Cup 
 1989–90 Whitbread in Fisher & Paykel a Maxi Ketch designed by Farr Yacht Design 
 1991 Fastnet 
 1993–94 New Zealand Endeavour
 1997–98 Merit Cup – Volvo Ocean 60
 2001–02 Amer Sports One – Volvo Ocean 60 designed by German Frers

He then skippered and won The Race, a sprint around the world on maxi catamaran Club Med. The race started on 1 January 2001 and finished on 3 March. Club Med broke several records along the way including the distance sailed in 24 hours (656 nautical miles) and the fastest circumnavigation (62 days and 7 hours).

America's Cup
He was called in to restructure and revitalise Team New Zealand after its loss of the America's Cup in February 2003.

 2017 35th America's Cup Team New Zealand CEO Winning Team
 2021 36th America's Cup Team New Zealand CEO Winning Team

Motorcycle road racing career

Manx GP & Classic TT
In 2014, at 57 years old, Grant entered the Manx Grand Prix as a newcomer, and also the F1 Classic TT, saying 'I’ve done seven laps around the world and a few America's Cups, but this is the most extreme thing I’ve ever done.'

Dalton's 2014 Classic TT could perhaps best be described as a baptism of fire, given his lack of relevant experience; his best lap in qualifying in 2014 on his F1 Suzuki was 87.799 mph and he did not finish the Classic F1 TT, which was won by fellow Kiwi Bruce Anstey at a race average speed of 121.597 mph, but he was back in 2015 and this time qualified for the F1 TT with a lap of 100.047 mph. He gained a coveted finishers medal for the 2015 Classic F1 TT, with an overall race average speed for the four laps, which includes the time spent stationary in the pits for a gravity-fed refuelling stop, of 97.047 mph.

References

External links
 
 ISAF World Sailor Microsite
 Team New Zealand Website

1957 births
Living people
Sportspeople from Auckland
New Zealand male sailors (sport)
Team New Zealand sailors
New Zealand Officers of the Order of the British Empire
People educated at Saint Kentigern College
Volvo Ocean Race sailors
2013 America's Cup sailors
2007 America's Cup sailors